Douglasiidae is a small Lepidopteran family including around 28 species of micromoth whose adults are collectively called Douglas moths. The largest genus in the family is Tinagma. They are primarily found in the Palearctic (20 spp.) and Nearctic realms. The adults have a 6 to 15 mm wingspan, with a reduced hindwing venation and long fringes. The larvae are leaf miners or borers, primarily in stems and petioles, belonging to Boraginaceae, Labiatae, and Rosaceae.

Genera
 Klimeschia  Amsel, 1938 Palearctic
Protonyctia Meyrick, 1932 Ecuador
Tinagma Zeller, 1839 (=Douglasia Stainton, 1854) Palearctic and Nearctic
†Tanyglossus  Poinar, 2017 Cenomanian, Burmese amber, Myanmar

References

 ITIS report for Douglasiidae
 Natural History Museum genus database

External links

Microleps.org

 
Moth families
Leaf miners
Taxa named by Hermann von Heinemann
Taxa named by Maximilian Ferdinand Wocke